Ali Akbar Yousefi (born 30 April 1997 is a professional Iranian wrestler. He won gold medal in the 130 kg event at the 2021 World Wrestling Championships held in Oslo, Norway. In 2019, he won gold medal in the same event at the U23 World Wrestling Championships held in Budapest, Hungary and won bronze medal in 2018, U23.

By winning gold medal in 2021 Oslo, He became Iran's first-ever world champion in the heaviest Greco weight class in the  World Wrestling Championships.

References

External links 
 
 
 Ali A 

 
Living people 
People from Babol 
Iranian male sport wrestlers 
Asian Wrestling Championships medalists 
World Wrestling Champions 
Sportspeople from Mazandaran province 
21st-century Iranian people 
Islamic Solidarity Games competitors for Iran 
Year of birth missing (living people)